"Baby, You're Something" is a song written by Curly Putman, Rafe Van Hoy and Don Cook, and recorded by American country music artist John Conlee.  It was released in December 1979 as the second single from the album Forever.  The song reached #7 on the Billboard Hot Country Singles & Tracks chart.

Chart performance

References

1979 singles
1979 songs
John Conlee songs
Songs written by Don Cook
Songs written by Curly Putman
MCA Records singles
Songs written by Rafe Van Hoy